Anthony Leone (born May 27, 1987) is an American professional mixed martial artist who most recently competed in the Bantamweight division. A professional competitor since 2008, he has competed for Strikeforce, the WEC, Bellator MMA, and Absolute Championship Berkut.

Background
Leone went to Center Moriches High School in New York and then went to college at The University of Hawaii at Hilo.

At the age of 20, Leone spent 11 months training alongside at the B.J. Penn Mixed Martial Arts academy in Hilo, Hawaii.  Anthony splits his training time between Phuket Top Team in Phuket, Thailand, and Team Bomb Squad in New York.

Leone was a silver-medallist at the Pan-American Games in No-Gi Jiu-Jitsu and placed Bronze in the World No-Gi Championships. The wrestler and jiu jitsu player brought strong grappling credentials with him into his Mixed Martial Arts career, and embarked on an eight fight winning streak before the big promotions took note and snapped up the youngster, then based in Hawaii at BJ Penn’s Academy.

His brother Andrew Leone is a MMA fighter as well and competes in the Flyweight division.

Mixed martial arts career
After going 8-0 in regional shows, Leone signed with World Extreme Cagefighting. Leone lost to Renan Barão at WEC 49 and was released from the promotion.

Bellator MMA
Leone then signed with the Bellator MMA and came in to fight as a late replacement. He lost to Georgi Karakhanyan at Bellator 28.

He faced Jeff Lentz at Bellator 44 on May 14, 2011 and lost via unanimous decision.

Leone faced Claudio Ledesma at Bellator 68 on May 11, 2012. Leone won the fight via split decision.

Leone defeated former Bellator Bantamweight Champion Zach Makovsky at Bellator 83 via split decision.

On July 31, 2013, Leone defeated Frank Baca at Bellator 97 in the Semifinals of the Bellator 2013 Summer Series Bantamweight Tournament via rear naked choke.

On October 4, 2013, Leone was defeated by Rafael Silva at Bellator 102 in the Finals of the Bellator 2013 Summer Series Bantamweight Tournament via unanimous decision.  However, Silva suffered a knee injury and Leone was called to step in and fight Eduardo Dantas for the Bellator Bantamweight Championship on March 7, 2014 at Bellator 111. After winning the first round, Leone lost in the second round due to a rear-naked choke submission.

Leone has since part ways with Bellator.

Absolute Championship Berkut
Leone faced Chechen super star MMA prospect Rasul Albaskhanov at ACB 49: Rostov onslaught on 26 November, 2016. He won the fight via submission in the third round.

Championships and accomplishments
Bellator MMA
Bellator 2013 Summer Series Bantamweight Tournament Runner-Up

Mixed martial arts record

|-
| Loss
| align=center| 17–9
| Denis Lavrentyev
| TKO (corner stoppage)
| RCC Intro 3
| 
| align=center| 2
| align=center| 5:00	
| Ekaterinburg, Russia
|
|-
| Win
| align=center| 17–8
| Magomed Ginazov
| Decision (unanimous)
| ACB 85: Leone vs. Ginazov
| 
| align=center| 3
| align=center| 5:00	
| Rimini, Italy
|
|-
| Win
| align=center| 16–8
| Dean Garnett
| Submission (guillotine choke)
| |ACB 76: Young Eagles 23
| 
| align=center| 2
| align=center| 4:40	
| Gold Coast, Australia
|Returned to Bantamweight.
|-
| Loss
| align=center| 15–8
| Askar Askarov
| Submission (twister)
| ACB 58: Young Eagles 17
| 
| align=center| 3
| align=center| 2:49
| Khasavyurt, Russia
| 
|-
| Win
| align=center| 15–7
| Rasul Albaskhanov
| Submission (guillotine choke)
| ACB 49: Rostov Onslaught
| 
| align=center| 3
| align=center| 0:28
| Rostov-on-Don, Russia
| 
|-
| Win
| align=center| 14–7
| Shamil Magomedov
| Submission (rear-naked choke)
| WFCA 16: Grand Prix Akhmat
| 
| align=center| 2
| align=center| 4:46
| Grozny, Russia
| Grand Prix Akhmat 2016 Tournament Quarterfinals; Flyweight debut.
|-
| Loss
| align=center| 13–7
| Eduardo Dantas
| Submission (rear-naked choke)
| Bellator 111
| 
| align=center| 2
| align=center| 2:04
| Thackerville, Oklahoma, United States
| 
|-
| Loss
| align=center| 13–6
| Rafael Silva
| Decision (unanimous)
| Bellator 102
| 
| align=center| 3
| align=center| 5:00
| Visalia, California, United States
| 
|-
| Win
| align=center| 13–5
| Frank Baca
| Submission (rear-naked choke)
| Bellator 97
| 
| align=center| 3
| align=center| 1:07
| Rio Rancho, New Mexico, United States
| 
|-
| Win
| align=center| 12–5
| Zach Makovsky
| Decision (split)
| Bellator 83
| 
| align=center| 3
| align=center| 5:00
| Atlantic City, New Jersey, United States
| 
|-
| Win
| align=center| 11–5
| Claudio Ledesma
| Decision (split)
| Bellator 68
| 
| align=center| 3
| align=center| 5:00
| Atlantic City, New Jersey, United States
|Bantamweight debut.
|-
| Win
| align=center| 10–5
| Paul Gorman
| Submission (armbar)
| New England Fights: Fight Night
| 
| align=center| 2
| align=center| 2:11
| Lewiston, Maine, United States
| 
|-
| Loss
| align=center| 9–5
| Brylan Van Artsdalen
| Technical Submission (guillotine choke)
| XFE: Cage Wars 8: House of Pain
| 
| align=center| 1
| align=center| 1:45
| Atlantic City, New Jersey, United States
| 
|-
| Win
| align=center| 9–4
| Bill Jones
| Decision (unanimous)
| World Championship Fighting 11
| 
| align=center| 3
| align=center| 5:00
| Wilmington, Massachusetts, United States
| 
|-
| Loss
| align=center| 8–4
| Jeff Lentz
| Decision (unanimous)
| Bellator 44
| 
| align=center| 3
| align=center| 5:00
| Atlantic City, New Jersey, United States
| 
|-
| Loss
| align=center| 8–3
| Josh LaBerge
| TKO (doctor stoppage)
| Strikeforce: Fedor vs. Silva
| 
| align=center| 1
| align=center| 5:00
| East Rutherford, New Jersey, United States
| 
|-
| Loss
| align=center| 8–2
| Georgi Karakhanyan
| Decision (unanimous)
| Bellator 28
| 
| align=center| 3
| align=center| 5:00
| New Orleans, Louisiana, United States
| 
|-
| Loss
| align=center| 8–1
| Renan Barão
| Submission (armbar)
| WEC 49
| 
| align=center| 3
| align=center| 2:29
| Edmonton, Alberta, Canada
|Catchweight (142 lbs) bout.
|-
| Win
| align=center| 8–0
| Tateki Matsuda
| Decision (split)
| Xtreme Championship Fight League 2
| 
| align=center| 5
| align=center| 5:00
| Lowell, Massachusetts, United States
| 
|-
| Win
| align=center| 7–0
| Doug Sonier
| Submission (armbar)
| Blood Brothers MMA 2
| 
| align=center| 1
| align=center| 1:27
| Akwesasne, New York, United States
| 
|-
| Win
| align=center| 6–0
| Dustin Pague
| Submission (choke)
| PA Fighting Championships 1
| 
| align=center| 2
| align=center| 4:58
| Harrisburg, Pennsylvania, United States
| 
|-
| Win
| align=center| 5–0
| Chris Grandmaison
| Decision (unanimous)
| World Championship Fighting 6
| 
| align=center| 2
| align=center| 5:00
| Wilmington, Massachusetts, United States
| 
|-
| Win
| align=center| 4–0
| Pat White
| Submission (rear-naked choke)
| WCA: Pure Combat
| 
| align=center| 1
| align=center| 4:36
| Atlantic City, New Jersey, United States
| 
|-
| Win
| align=center| 3–0
| Jeff Denz
| Decision (unanimous)
| RW 2: Rage in the Cage
| 
| align=center| 3
| align=center| 3:00
| Irving, New York, United States
| 
|-
| Win
| align=center| 2–0
| Chris Correira
| Submission (armbar)
| Cage Fight: MMA 3
| 
| align=center| 1
| align=center| 1:49
| Bedford, New Hampshire, United States
| 
|-
| Win
| align=center| 1–0
| Tyler Kahihikolo
| Decision
| ROTR: Beatdown 7
| 
| align=center| N/A
| align=center| N/A
| Hawaii, United States
|

External links

References 

1987 births
Living people
People from Center Moriches, New York
American male mixed martial artists
Mixed martial artists from New York (state)
Featherweight mixed martial artists
Place of birth missing (living people)
Bantamweight mixed martial artists
Mixed martial artists utilizing Brazilian jiu-jitsu
Sportspeople from Suffolk County, New York
American practitioners of Brazilian jiu-jitsu